Haifa Sport Club, is an Iraqi football team based in Al-Baladiyat, Baghdad, that plays in the Iraq Division Two.

History

founding and naming
Haifa Club was established on March 21, 1973 in Baghdad for the Palestinian community in Iraq. The name of the club was taken from the name of Haifa, the well-known city in Palestine.

in Premier League
Haifa team played in the Iraqi Premier League for the first time in the 1999–2000 season, and the team was not good enough, and finished the season at the bottom of the standings.

Managerial history

  Saad Shihab

See also 
 2020–21 Iraq FA Cup

References

External links
 Haifa SC on Goalzz.com
 Iraq Clubs- Foundation Dates

1973 establishments in Iraq
Association football clubs established in 1973
Football clubs in Baghdad
Sport in Baghdad